Oil City North Side Historic District, also known as Cottage Hill, Palace Hill, and Polish Hill, is a national historic district located at Oil City, Venango County, Pennsylvania.  It is directly north of the Oil City Downtown Commercial Historic District.  The district includes 1,140 contributing buildings in a predominantly residential section of Oil City.  It includes a few neighborhood commercial buildings, churches, and two schools.  The houses were built between about 1870 and 1945 and are in a variety of popular architectural styles including Romanesque Revival, Queen Anne, Second Empire, Colonial Revival, Classical Revival, and Italianate.  It also includes a number of working class vernacular dwellings, especially in the Polish Hill section.

It was added to the National Register of Historic Places in 1999.

References

Historic districts on the National Register of Historic Places in Pennsylvania
Italianate architecture in Pennsylvania
Romanesque Revival architecture in Pennsylvania
Colonial Revival architecture in Pennsylvania
Queen Anne architecture in Pennsylvania
Buildings and structures in Oil City, Pennsylvania
National Register of Historic Places in Venango County, Pennsylvania